Charles Eamer Kempe (29 June 1837 – 29 April 1907) was a British Victorian era designer and manufacturer of stained glass. His studios produced over 4,000 windows and also designs for altars and altar frontals, furniture and furnishings, lichgates and memorials that helped to define a later nineteenth-century Anglican style. The list of English cathedrals containing examples of his work includes: Chester, Gloucester, Hereford, Lichfield, Wells, Winchester and York. Kempe's networks of patrons and influence stretched from the Royal Family and the Church of England hierarchy to the literary and artistic beau monde.

Early life 

Charles Kempe was born at Ovingdean Hall, near Brighton, East Sussex in 1837. He was the youngest son of Nathaniel Kemp (1759–1843), a cousin of Thomas Read Kemp, a politician and property developer responsible for the Kemptown area of Brighton and the maternal grandson of Sir John Eamer, who served as Lord Mayor of London in 1801. The fact that Kempe's father was almost eighty when he was born coloured his life and attitudes.

Studying with William Morris 
After attending Twyford School and Rugby, he attended Pembroke College, Oxford where he was influenced by the Anglo-Catholic Tractarian revival and considered a vocation to the priesthood. It was at Oxford that Kempe was inspired by seeing William Morris design the Debating Chamber at the Oxford Union. When he realised he was unable to manage his stammer, Kempe decided that "if I was not permitted to minister in the Sanctuary I would use my talents to adorn it", and subsequently went to study architecture with the firm of a leading ecclesiastical architect George Frederick Bodley. His first task, on leaving Oxford, was to gain some work experience.  With the help of his well-connected father, Kempe was able to persuade Bodley to take him on as an assistant, and thus he found himself in Cambridge just at the time when Bodley was beginning the building and decoration of All Saints Church, Cambridge. Here he was able to learn from both Bodley and Morris and to develop his sense of how to colour a church. With Morris and Bodley, Kempe learned the aesthetic principles of medieval church art, particularly stained glass. During the 1860s Kempe collaborated with Bodley on the internal painting of two churches, All Saints, Jesus Lane in Cambridge and St John’s, Tuebrook in Liverpool. Later, in 1892, Bodley and Kempe would work together once more on All Saints at Danehill, East Sussex.

Kempe Studios 

In 1866 he opened a studio of his own in London, supplying and creating stained glass and furnishings and vestments. The firm prospered and by 1899 he had over fifty employees. As a trademark, the firm used a golden 'garb' or heraldic wheatsheaf, taken from Kempe's own coat of arms. The mid-Victorian period were important years in the history of the design of English churches and Kempe’s influence is found in numerous examples, many in his home county of Sussex which has 116 examples of his work. The works at St Mark’s, Staplefield near Horsham, West Sussex dating from 1869 are regarded as especially important, representing the earliest of three known examples of Kempe’s wall painting. They contain key elements of Kempe’s figurative work. The angels holding the scroll are magnificently apparelled and the borders of their cloaks are embellished with pearls, each individually highlighted although they do not contain a design of peacock feathers, a well used embellishment in later works. Rosalie Glynn Grylls, Lady Mander, whose home Wightwick Manor, near Wolverhampton, contains many pieces of Kempe's stained glass, wrote in 1973:
"Kempe's work has a unique charm; its colours shine out from jewels that cluster on the mitres or the crowns his figures wear and from their peacocks' feathers, while angels playing their instruments are drawn with tender delicacy and scattered above the main windows informally but making a pattern of precision. Above all, the prevailing yellow wash is literally translucent, for it lets through the rays of the full or the setting sun..." Kempe's memorial windows at St Martin's Church, Newton Park (1879), near Leeds, are fine examples of his work and his stained glass remained much in demand in England well into the 20th century. One of Kempe's last pieces of work can be seen in the Chapel at the Duke of York's Royal Military School, Dover, Kent.

Kempe's students include Charles Edward Tute (1858 – 4 November 1927), who was born in Ripon. Many of his windows, signed "CET", show influence of the master. In 1906 he migrated to Australia, where he was also known for his bookplates. He died in Brisbane.
 
On Kempe’s death in 1907 in accordance with his will the firm was reformed as C. E. Kempe & Co. Ltd and Kempe's distant cousin, Walter Ernest Tower (1873–1955), was appointed chairman. The company thenceforth used a black tower above the golden garb as its mark. A lack of orders caused by the Great Depression ended the firm in 1934.

Personal life
Kempe was a rather shy person, who never married. He continued to live in Sussex most of his life and in 1875 he bought and renovated an Elizabethan house at Lindfield, near Haywards Heath in West Sussex. Kempe would entertain his clients and professional colleagues from his home enjoying the role of a country squire.

Kempe died suddenly on 28 April 1907 aged 69, at 28 Nottingham Place, London, refusing to get medical help after catching a cold that led to congestion of the lung. He is buried in the churchyard at St Wulfran's Church, Ovingdean. Most of Kempe's records were disposed of after the firm shut in 1934.

Books on Kempe 
Charles Eamer Kempe remains a widely studied designer and artist. Author Adrian Barlow produced two books in 2018 and 2019 which discuss Kempe's life and the artists that surrounded him: Kempe: The Life, Art and Legacy of Charles Eamer Kempe published by The Lutterworth Press in August 2018 and Espying Heaven: The Stained Glass of Charles Eamer Kempe and his Artists in January 2019.

Locations of Kempe's stained-glass windows

Gallery

See also 
 British and Irish stained glass (1811–1918)
 Victorian Era
 Gothic Revival

References

Notes

External links

 'Kempe' by Adrian Barlow, published by The Lutterworth Press
 'Espying Heaven' by Adrian Barlow, published by The Lutterworth Press
 The Kempe Society
 Monmouth Group of Parishes: Charles Eamer Kempe
 The Parish Church of St Mary Magdalene: Charles Eamer Kempe – Stained Glass Windows
 Victorian Wolverhampton: A Town Through Its Buildings – Architects and Craftsmen of Wolverhampton's Buildings

1837 births
1907 deaths
English stained glass artists and manufacturers
History of glass
Alumni of Pembroke College, Oxford
People educated at Twyford School
People from Brighton and Hove
English Anglo-Catholics